Glenn Philip Walker (born 15 March 1967) is an English former professional association footballer who played as a midfielder. He made two appearances in the Football League.

References

1967 births
Living people
Footballers from Warrington
English footballers
Association football midfielders
Burnley F.C. players
Crewe Alexandra F.C. players
English Football League players